Seb Shelton is a British musician, who was the drummer for bands such as the Young Bucks (1978–1979), Secret Affair (1979–1980), and Dexys Midnight Runners (1980–1983). Shelton was offered the drummer's job in the Specials but turned it down.

Shelton went on to manage other rock bands and musicians including the Woodentops, Tackhead, Adrian Sherwood, Keith Leblanc, Shelleyan Orphan, and Julian Cope.

References

English rock drummers
Dexys Midnight Runners members
Living people
New wave drummers
Year of birth missing (living people)
Mod revival musicians

Big hobby has been angling. In the 1990s he competed at surfcasting competitions. He has caught numerous large fish in fresh waters.